The Unholy is a 1988 American horror film directed by Camilo Vila and starring Ben Cross, Ned Beatty, Hal Holbrook, and Trevor Howard in his final role. The film follows a Roman Catholic priest in New Orleans who finds himself battling a demonic force after being appointed to a new parish.

Plot
While praying in St. Agnes church in New Orleans, Father Dennis is confronted by a demon taking the shape of a seductive woman. The woman tears his throat open, killing him. Several years later at a New Orleans hotel, Father Michael is called to talk to a man named Claude who is threatening to jump from the top floor of the building. When he offers Claude a cigarette, Michael is pulled out the window and falls to the ground. Inexplicably, he survives the fall without injury. After the incident, Michael is appointed to the St. Agnes parish by the Archbishop Mosely; the parish had been closed after Father Dennis's unsolved murder.

Upon moving into the rectory, Michael is notified by Lieutenant Stern that another priest was murdered there before Father Dennis. Michael finds mention of Millie, a waitress at the Threshold, a local black magic performance art club, in Dennis's journal; Michael goes to visit her, but she is evasive. She later comes to the parish, claiming to Michael that she saw Father Dennis for confession before his death; during the confession, she admitted to giving her soul to Luke, the owner of the club, whom she claims is the Devil incarnate. Luke visits Michael shortly after, claiming that the Satanic shows put on at the club are only gimmicks, and that he does not actually believe in them; however, he says he has been recently experiencing supernatural phenomena and begs for Michael's help. Michael agrees to spend an evening in Luke's apartment, where he witnesses furious poltergeist activity.

When Michael brings the information to Archbishop Mosely, he is informed that Father Dennis was approached by Millie and Luke in an identical manner before being murdered. Father Silva, an elderly blind demonologist, informs Michael he has been "chosen" to fight the devil, but Michael dismisses the notion. Millie is incarcerated in a psychiatric ward after attempting to kill Luke, and Michael goes to visit her. In a fit of madness, she claims Luke tried to rape her, and that Father Dennis has been talking to her. That night, Michael has a nightmare of the Demon, and receives a disturbing phone call from Father Dennis, who claims he is "waiting for him in hell." Millie arrives in the middle of the night begging for help, and Michael agrees to let her stay in the rectory.

While cleaning the church with the housekeeper Teresa, Millie is fascinated by a statue of the Immaculate Heart of Mary, which Teresa tells her was salvaged from a church in a foreign country that burned down. Lieutenant Stern warns Archbishop Mosely that Michael is in danger, suspecting Millie was responsible for the previous murders of the St. Agnes priests; Mosely assures him that Michael is safe. Meanwhile, Millie discovers a book in which she reads of a demon known as the Unholy, which seeks to corrupt and then take pure souls. To prevent herself from being a target, she propositions Michael to take her virginity, which he refuses. Convinced Luke planted the book, Michael confronts him, but Luke denies it. 
 
The next day, Michael finds Luke's eviscerated corpse hanging above the church altar in the pose of the Cross of Saint Peter. Seated in a pew is Claude, who begs Michael's forgiveness for pulling him out the window. Suddenly, Claude begins to bleed profusely from his eyes and mouth, and bursts into flames at the foot of the Immaculate Heart of Mary statue; Luke's corpse also ignites. Michael meets with the Archbishop and Father Silva, who warns him that the Unholy will manifest to Michael between Ash Wednesday and Easter, when it will try to tempt and then kill him. In the church, Michael is confronted by the Unholy (taking form as the woman), and she attempts to seduce him, but he denies her.

The Unholy reveals its true form—a monstrous creature—and two mutant creatures crucify Michael. Millie enters the church and is confronted by the creature, but before it can harm her, Michael calls upon God for strength, and damns the Unholy to hell. He collapses, and when he awakens, is blind. As Millie walks him out of the church, the Immaculate Heart of Mary statue begins to weep tears of blood.

Cast
Ben Cross as Father Michael 
Ned Beatty as Lieutenant Stern 
William Russ as Luke
Jill Carroll as Millie
Hal Holbrook as Archbishop Mosely 
Trevor Howard as Father Silva 
Claudia Robinson as Teresa 
Nicole Fortier as Demon 
Peter Frechette as Claude
Earleen Carey as Lucile
Lari White as Housekeeper

Production
English actor Ben Cross was cast in the film as the lead of Father Michael; at the time, he was a roommate of Cuban director Camilo Vila, who offered him the role.

Exterior photography was complete in New Orleans, after which the production relocated to Florida, where interiors were filmed.

In crafting the elaborate special effects for the film's conclusion, effects designer Jerry Macaluso was inspired by the Alien queen in the Alien film series. The film's conclusion, which features a protracted showdown with the demon in the church, was shot with this version of the creature; in the scene, the church's stained glass windows systematically explode before the creature is damned to hell. However, director Vila was unhappy with the creature's appearance on film, after which an alternate version was crafted by a different special effects team; this required that the ending be re-shot under effects supervisor Bob Keen.

Release
The film was released theatrically in the United States by Vestron Pictures in April 1988. It grossed $6,337,299 at the box office.

Critical reception
Walter Goodman of The New York Times wrote of the film: "Camilo Vila's direction is on the labored side - ponderous movement accompanied by dirgelike music. The photography is as murky as the story, filling the screen with shadows that are periodically blasted by an unilluminating light. There's enough dry ice and tomato sauce laid on to supply a fast-food joint for a couple of years. The theaters may have to be exorcised, or at least aired out". The Washington Posts Richard Harrington wrote in his review of the film: "It's getting so that horror films can be judged by their exit lines. In the case of The Unholy, that line is "take me out of here". By the time it rolls around, most viewers are likely to wish it had cropped up at the beginning of this tedious film that dares to go where everyone has gone before (most recently John Carpenter in Prince of Darkness).

Home media
The film was released on DVD by Lionsgate in the United Kingdom in 2007. In 2012, Lionsgate has released the film on DVD in North America as part of an 8-horror film set featuring titles from Vestron's catalogue, such as Waxwork (1988), Chopping Mall (1986), Slaughter High (1986), and others.

It was released for the first time on Blu-ray on June 27, 2017 as part of Lionsgate's Vestron Video Collector's Series line; the Blu-ray features three featurettes including cast and crew interviews, the film's original ending, an audio commentary with director Vila, as well as the original theatrical trailer and other promotional material.

References

External links
 
 
 

1988 films
1988 horror films
American supernatural horror films
Demons in film
Religious horror films
Films shot in New Orleans
Vestron Pictures films
Films set in religious buildings and structures
Films set in New Orleans
1980s English-language films
1980s American films